Local elections were held in Pasay on May 11, 1998 within the Philippine general election. The voters elected for the elective local posts in the city: the mayor, vice mayor, the representative for the lone district, and the councilors, six of them in the two districts of the city.

Background 
Mayor Pablo Cuneta won't ran for re-election. Representative and former Mayor Jovito Claudio ran for mayor. He was challenged by Vice Mayor Wenceslao "Peewee" Trinidad.

Second District Councilor Greg Alcera ran for Vice Mayor. He was challenged by Second District Councilor Emmanuel "Lito" Ibay, Edgardo "Arding" Cuneta, son of former Mayor Pablo Cuneta, and other candidates

Rep. Jovito Claudio was on second term and ran as Mayor. Elinor "Elaine" Gamboa-Cuneta, wife of outgoing Mayor Pablo Cuneta ran for his place. Cuneta was challenged by Rolando "Ding" Briones and Edita "Edith" Vergel de Dios.

Candidates

Team Claudio-Ibay-Cuneta

Team Trinidad-Alcera-Vergel De Dios

Team Kaibigan

Results
Names written in bold-Italic are the re-elected incumbents while in italic are incumbents lost in elections.

For District Representative
Rolando "Ding" Briones won. Briones defeated former City's First Lady Elinor "Elaine" Gamboa-Cuneta and Second District Councilor Edita "Edith" Vergel de Dios.

For Mayor
Representative and former Mayor Dr. Jovito Claudio won. Claudio won in a tight election to Vice Mayor Wenceslao Trinidad with margin of 228 votes.

For Vice Mayor 
Second District Councilor Greg Alcera was elected.

First District
Four of the six incumbents were re-elected. Uldarico Arabia and Teodulo Lorca Jr. were lost in the elections. Newly-elected councilors were Jose Antonio Roxas and Reynaldo Mateo, brother of former Councilor Florencio Mateo.

|-bgcolor=black
|colspan=5|

Second District
One of the six incumbents was re-elected. Gregorio Alcera ran and won as Vice Mayor. Emmanuel Ibay and Alberto Alvarez won't ran for re-elections. Edita Vergel de Dios ran for representative but lost to Rolando Briones. Roberto Alvarez ran but lost. Nelwy-elected councilors were Allan Panaligan, Ma. Consuelo Dy, Imelda Calixto-Rubiano, Arvin "Bong" Tolentino, and Pedro Tiamzon.

|-bgcolor=black
|colspan=5|

Note 
Due to limited or no source for this election online, no citations has made.

The main sources are the old election results that may be kept by the local election precinct of the city.

References

External links
 https://www.ifes.org/sites/default/files/b00339_0.pdf

1998 Philippine local elections
Elections in Pasay